Return of the Saint is a British action-adventure television series that aired for one series in 1978 and 1979 in Britain on ITV, and was also broadcast on CBS in the United States. It was co-produced by ITC Entertainment and the Italian broadcaster RAI and ran for 24 episodes.

Premise
Return of the Saint is a revival/updating of The Saint, a programme based upon the stories of Leslie Charteris that had originally aired from 1962 to 1969, and starred Roger Moore as Simon Templar (the character, in turn, had been introduced by Charteris in a series of novels and short stories dating back to 1928). The new series starred Ian Ogilvy as Templar, an independently wealthy, somewhat mysterious 'do-gooder' known as 'The Saint'. Templar is shown travelling around Britain and Europe, helping out the people he encounters, though he is also often summoned by past acquaintances.

The series borrowed a few storytelling elements from its predecessor. Once again, each episode began with Simon narrating an introduction to set the scene for viewers, and each pre-credit sequence ended with an animated halo appearing above Templar's head as he was identified. Return also made a recurring reference to the 1930s–40s film series, and the 1940s radio series that starred Vincent Price as Templar: just before the opening credits begin, a short musical phrase is heard that is not part of the theme music for the Return of the Saint, but is the character's signature theme from film and radio. Unlike the film series, and occasional episodes of the Roger Moore series, Ogilvy's series did not feature any recurring characters besides Simon.

Other than these cosmetic touches, there is no continuity implied between the Ogilvy and Moore series.

Production
One major difference between the two series is that the original was mostly filmed in British studios and locations (although set in various places around the world), while many episodes of Return were filmed on location throughout Europe. The music was written by John Scott and, like the last colour series of The Saint, incorporated Leslie Charteris' own theme, which had previously been used in films and on radio. For the French version, Scott's music was replaced with a theme incorporating vocals (as had happened to previous Saint composer Edwin Astley with Danger Man), but Charteris' eight-note theme remained.

Jaguar seized promotional opportunities with Return of the Saint. A decade and a half earlier, Jaguar had turned down the producers of The Saint when approached about the E-Type; the producers had instead used a Volvo P1800. In Return Templar drives an XJ-S with the number plate "ST 1". Miniature versions were made by Corgi and proved popular.

According to Burl Barer in his history of The Saint, the series was originally conceived as Son of the Saint, with Ogilvy's character identified as the offspring of Simon Templar. As production neared, it was decided to drop the relative angle and make the series about the original character, albeit updated to the late 1970s.

Unlike the earlier series, Return of the Saint did not adapt any Charteris stories; however, several teleplays (such as "The Imprudent Professor" and "Collision Course") were adapted as novels that were credited to Charteris but written by others. A number of Saint books were reprinted with covers depicting Ogilvy as Templar as a tie-in with the series; these collectable volumes carried the Return of the Saint title. The adaptation of "Collision Course", retitled Salvage for the Saint was published in 1983 (several years after the series ended) and was the 50th and final Saint book to be published in a series of publications dating back to the 1920s. The two episodes of "Collision Course" were also edited together to form the syndicated TV-movie, The Saint and the Brave Goose.

Legacy

Ogilvy became very popular in Britain and Europe because of the series and in the early 1980s was considered a major contender for replacing Moore as James Bond. Ogilvy never got the role but did record a series of popular audiobook adaptations of the Bond novels in the late 1970s and played a Bond-like character for a 1980s TV commercial.

Broadcasts of the series on CBS, which lasted into 1980, sparked a revival of interest in Moore's original series.

Robert S. Baker, who developed and produced the earlier The Saint series for Roger Moore, performed the same duties with Return of the Saint. Years later, Baker was also executive producer of the 1997 Saint film starring Val Kilmer as Templar.

Return of The Saint is now seen as the last of the action/adventure television series produced by ITC Entertainment.

Charteris cameo
Saint creator Leslie Charteris makes an Alfred Hitchcock-style walk-on cameo appearance in the "Collision Course" two-parter.

Episodes

External links

Episode guide to The Saint on TV on saint.org

1970s British drama television series
1970s British crime television series
1978 British television series debuts
1979 British television series endings
CBS original programming
Television shows shot at EMI-Elstree Studios
Television series by ITC Entertainment
ITV television dramas
The Saint (Simon Templar)
Television shows based on British novels
Espionage television series
English-language television shows
Television series reboots